Naturally occurring titanium (22Ti) is composed of five stable isotopes; 46Ti, 47Ti, 48Ti, 49Ti and 50Ti with 48Ti being the most abundant (73.8% natural abundance). Twenty-one radioisotopes have been characterized, with the most stable being 44Ti with a half-life of 60 years, 45Ti with a half-life of 184.8 minutes, 51Ti with a half-life of 5.76 minutes, and 52Ti with a half-life of 1.7 minutes. All of the remaining radioactive isotopes have half-lives that are less than 33 seconds, and the majority of these have half-lives that are less than half a second.

The isotopes of titanium range in atomic mass from 38.01 u (38Ti) to 62.99 u (63Ti). The primary decay mode for isotopes lighter than the stable isotopes (lighter than 46Ti) is β+ and the primary mode for the heavier ones (heavier than 50Ti) is β−; their respective decay products are scandium isotopes and the primary products after are vanadium isotopes.

List of isotopes 

|-
| rowspan=3|39Ti
| rowspan=3 style="text-align:right" | 22
| rowspan=3 style="text-align:right" | 17
| rowspan=3|39.00161(22)#
| rowspan=3|31(4) ms[31(+6-4) ms]
| β+, p (85%)
| 38Ca
| rowspan=3|3/2+#
| rowspan=3|
| rowspan=3|
|-
| β+ (15%)
| 39Sc
|-
| β+, 2p (<.1%)
| 37K
|-
| rowspan=2|40Ti
| rowspan=2 style="text-align:right" | 22
| rowspan=2 style="text-align:right" | 18
| rowspan=2|39.99050(17)
| rowspan=2|53.3(15) ms
| β+ (56.99%)
| 40Sc
| rowspan=2|0+
| rowspan=2|
| rowspan=2|
|-
| β+, p (43.01%)
| 39Ca
|-
| rowspan=2|41Ti
| rowspan=2 style="text-align:right" | 22
| rowspan=2 style="text-align:right" | 19
| rowspan=2|40.98315(11)#
| rowspan=2|80.4(9) ms
| β+, p (>99.9%)
| 40Ca
| rowspan=2|3/2+
| rowspan=2|
| rowspan=2|
|-
| β+ (<.1%)
| 41Sc
|-
| 42Ti
| style="text-align:right" | 22
| style="text-align:right" | 20
| 41.973031(6)
| 199(6) ms
| β+
| 42Sc
| 0+
|
|
|-
| 43Ti
| style="text-align:right" | 22
| style="text-align:right" | 21
| 42.968522(7)
| 509(5) ms
| β+
| 43Sc
| 7/2−
|
|
|-
| style="text-indent:1em" | 43m1Ti
| colspan="3" style="text-indent:2em" | 313.0(10) keV
| 12.6(6) μs
|
|
| (3/2+)
|
|
|-
| style="text-indent:1em" | 43m2Ti
| colspan="3" style="text-indent:2em" | 3066.4(10) keV
| 560(6) ns
|
|
| (19/2−)
|
|
|-
| 44Ti
| style="text-align:right" | 22
| style="text-align:right" | 22
| 43.9596901(8)
| 60.0(11) y
| EC
| 44Sc
| 0+
|
|
|-
| 45Ti
| style="text-align:right" | 22
| style="text-align:right" | 23
| 44.9581256(11)
| 184.8(5) min
| β+
| 45Sc
| 7/2−
|
|
|-
| 46Ti
| style="text-align:right" | 22
| style="text-align:right" | 24
| 45.9526316(9)
| colspan=3 align=center|Stable
| 0+
| 0.0825(3)
|
|-
| 47Ti
| style="text-align:right" | 22
| style="text-align:right" | 25
| 46.9517631(9)
| colspan=3 align=center|Stable
| 5/2−
| 0.0744(2)
|
|-
| 48Ti
| style="text-align:right" | 22
| style="text-align:right" | 26
| 47.9479463(9)
| colspan=3 align=center|Stable
| 0+
| 0.7372(3)
|
|-
| 49Ti
| style="text-align:right" | 22
| style="text-align:right" | 27
| 48.9478700(9)
| colspan=3 align=center|Stable
| 7/2−
| 0.0541(2)
|
|-
| 50Ti
| style="text-align:right" | 22
| style="text-align:right" | 28
| 49.9447912(9)
| colspan=3 align=center|Stable
| 0+
| 0.0518(2)
|
|-
| 51Ti
| style="text-align:right" | 22
| style="text-align:right" | 29
| 50.946615(1)
| 5.76(1) min
| β−
| 51V
| 3/2−
|
|
|-
| 52Ti
| style="text-align:right" | 22
| style="text-align:right" | 30
| 51.946897(8)
| 1.7(1) min
| β−
| 52V
| 0+
|
|
|-
| 53Ti
| style="text-align:right" | 22
| style="text-align:right" | 31
| 52.94973(11)
| 32.7(9) s
| β−
| 53V
| (3/2)−
|
|
|-
| 54Ti
| style="text-align:right" | 22
| style="text-align:right" | 32
| 53.95105(13)
| 1.5(4) s
| β−
| 54V
| 0+
|
|
|-
| 55Ti
| style="text-align:right" | 22
| style="text-align:right" | 33
| 54.95527(16)
| 490(90) ms
| β−
| 55V
| 3/2−#
|
|
|-
| rowspan=2|56Ti
| rowspan=2 style="text-align:right" | 22
| rowspan=2 style="text-align:right" | 34
| rowspan=2|55.95820(21)
| rowspan=2|164(24) ms
| β− (>99.9%)
| 56V
| rowspan=2|0+
| rowspan=2|
| rowspan=2|
|-
| β−, n (<.1%)
| 55V
|-
| rowspan=2|57Ti
| rowspan=2 style="text-align:right" | 22
| rowspan=2 style="text-align:right" | 35
| rowspan=2|56.96399(49)
| rowspan=2|60(16) ms
| β− (>99.9%)
| 57V
| rowspan=2|5/2−#
| rowspan=2|
| rowspan=2|
|-
| β−, n (<.1%)
| 56V
|-
| 58Ti
| style="text-align:right" | 22
| style="text-align:right" | 36
| 57.96697(75)#
| 54(7) ms
| β−
| 58V
| 0+
|
|
|-
| 59Ti
| style="text-align:right" | 22
| style="text-align:right" | 37
| 58.97293(75)#
| 30(3) ms
| β−
| 59V
| (5/2−)#
|
|
|-
| 60Ti
| style="text-align:right" | 22
| style="text-align:right" | 38
| 59.97676(86)#
| 22(2) ms
| β−
| 60V
| 0+
|
|
|-
| rowspan=2|61Ti
| rowspan=2 style="text-align:right" | 22
| rowspan=2 style="text-align:right" | 39
| rowspan=2|60.98320(97)#
| rowspan=2|10# ms[>300 ns]
| β−
| 61V
| rowspan=2|1/2−#
| rowspan=2|
| rowspan=2|
|-
| β−, n
| 60V
|-
| 62Ti
| style="text-align:right" | 22
| style="text-align:right" | 40
| 61.98749(97)#
| 10# ms
|
|
| 0+
|
|
|-
| 63Ti
| style="text-align:right" | 22
| style="text-align:right" | 41
| 62.99442(107)#
| 3# ms
|
|
| 1/2−#
|
|
|-
| 64Ti
| style="text-align:right" | 22
| style="text-align:right" | 42
| 63.998410(640)#
| 5# ms[>620 ns]
|
|
| 0+
|
|

Titanium-44 
Titanium-44 (44Ti) is a radioactive isotope of titanium that undergoes electron capture to an excited state of scandium-44 with a half-life of 60 years, before the ground state of 44Sc and ultimately 44Ca are populated. Because titanium-44 can only undergo electron capture, its half-life increases with ionization and it becomes stable in its fully ionized state (that is, having a charge of +22).

Titanium-44 is produced in relative abundance in the alpha process in stellar nucleosynthesis and the early stages of supernova explosions. It is produced when calcium-40 fuses with an alpha particle (helium-4 nucleus) in a star's high-temperature environment; the resulting 44Ti nucleus can then fuse with another alpha particle to form chromium-48. The age of supernovae may be determined through measurements of gamma-ray emissions from titanium-44 and its abundance. It was observed in the Cassiopeia A supernova remnant and SN 1987A at a relatively high concentration, a consequence of delayed decay resulting from ionizing conditions.

References 

 Isotope masses from:

 Isotopic compositions and standard atomic masses from:

 Half-life, spin, and isomer data selected from the following sources.

 
Titanium
Titaniun